The 1892 Chicago Athletic Association football team represented Chicago Athletic Association as an independent during the 1892 college football season. The team finished with a 3-4-1 record.

Schedule

References

Chicago Athletic Association
Chicago Athletic Association football seasons
Chicago Athletic Association football